"16" is the third single by Australian dance group Sneaky Sound System, taken from their second studio album 2.  It was released on 14 February 2009.

They performed the song on Australian television show Rove on 8 February 2009.

Track listing

Charts

(A) indicates TV Rock vs Luke Chapel remix.

Release history

External links
"16" CD single on Waterfront Records

References 

Sneaky Sound System songs
2008 singles
2008 songs
Songs written by Connie Mitchell